Enteroendocrine cells are specialized cells of the gastrointestinal tract and pancreas with endocrine function. They produce gastrointestinal hormones or peptides in response to various stimuli and release them into the bloodstream for systemic effect, diffuse them as local messengers, or transmit them to the enteric nervous system to activate nervous responses. Enteroendocrine cells of the intestine are the most numerous endocrine cells of the body. They constitute an enteric endocrine system as a subset of the endocrine system just as the enteric nervous system is a subset of the nervous system. In a sense they are known to act as chemoreceptors, initiating digestive actions and detecting harmful substances and initiating protective responses. Enteroendocrine cells are located in the stomach, in the intestine and in the pancreas. Microbiota plays key roles in the intestinal immune and metabolic responses in these enteroendocrine cells via their fermentation product (short chain fatty acid), acetate.

Intestinal enteroendocrine cells
Intestinal enteroendocrine cells are not clustered together but spread as single cells throughout the intestinal tract.

Hormones secreted include somatostatin, motilin, cholecystokinin, neurotensin, vasoactive intestinal peptide, and enteroglucagon. The enteroendocrine cells sense the metabolites from intestinal commensal microbiota and, in turn, coordinate antibacterial, mechanical, and metabolic branches of the host intestinal innate immune response to the commensal microbiota.

K cell
K cells secrete gastric inhibitory peptide, an incretin, which also promotes triglyceride storage. K cells are mostly found in the duodenum.

L cell
L cells secrete glucagon-like peptide-1, an incretin,  peptide YY3-36, oxyntomodulin and glucagon-like peptide-2. L cells are primarily found in the ileum and large intestine (colon), but some are also found in the duodenum and jejunum.

I cell
I cells secrete cholecystokinin (CCK), and are located in the duodenum and jejunum. They modulate bile secretion, exocrine pancreas secretion, and satiety.

G cell

Stomach enteroendocrine cells, which release gastrin, and stimulate gastric acid secretion.

Enterochromaffin cell
Enterochromaffin cells are enteroendocrine and neuroendocrine cells with a close similarity to adrenomedullary chromaffin cells secreting serotonin.

Enterochromaffin-like cell
Enterochromaffin-like cells or ECL cells are a type of neuroendocrine cell secreting histamine.

N cell 
Located in the jejunum, N cells release neurotensin, and control smooth muscle contraction.

S cell 

S cells secrete secretin from the duodenum and jejunum, and stimulate exocrine pancreatic secretion.

D cell

Also called Delta cells, D cells secrete somatostatin.

Mo cell (or M cell) 

 found in crypts of the small intestine, especially in the duodenum and jejunum.
 Different from the Microfold cells (M cells) that are in Peyer's patches.
 Secrete motilin

Gastric enteroendocrine cells
Gastric enteroendocrine cells are found in the gastric glands, mostly at their base. The G cells  secrete gastrin, post-ganglionic fibers of the vagus nerve can release gastrin-releasing peptide during parasympathetic stimulation to stimulate secretion. Enterochromaffin-like cells are enteroendocrine and  neuroendocrine cells also known for their similarity to chromaffin cells secreting histamine, which stimulates G cells to secrete gastrin.

Other hormones produced include cholecystokinin, somatostatin, vasoactive intestinal peptide, substance P, alpha and gamma-endorphin.

Pancreatic enteroendocrine cells
Pancreatic enteroendocrine cells are located in the islets of Langerhans and produce most importantly the hormones insulin and glucagon. The autonomous nervous system strongly regulates their secretion, with parasympathetic stimulation stimulating insulin secretion and inhibiting glucagon secretion and sympathetic stimulation having opposite effect.

Other hormones produced include somatostatin, pancreatic polypeptide, amylin and ghrelin.

Clinical significance
Rare and slow growing carcinoid and non-carcinoid tumors develop from these cells. When a tumor arises it has the capacity to secrete large volumes of hormones.

History
The very discovery of hormones occurred during studies of how the digestive system regulates its activities, as explained at Secretin § Discovery.

Other organisms 
In rats (Rattus rattus) the short-chain fatty acid receptor  is expressed both by this cell type and by mast cells of the mucosa.

See also 

APUD cells
Neuroendocrine tumors
List of human cell types derived from the germ layers

References

External links 
 - "Endocrine System: duodenum, enteroendocrine cells"

Endocrine system
Animal cells
Stomach
Secretory cells